Ida Crown Jewish Academy is a Modern Orthodox Jewish high school in Skokie, Illinois, under the auspicies of the Associated Talmud Torahs. Its current dean is Leonard Matanky.  ICJA places emphasis on both Judaic and Secular studies and holds its students to high academic standards. ICJA encourages its students to pursue a year in yeshiva or seminary in Israel before attending college. Ida Crown serves students from all over the Chicago area, including Chicago, Lincolnwood, Skokie, Northbrook, Highland Park, Glencoe, Deerfield, Buffalo Grove, Des Plaines, and Evanston.

As of the 2021-22 school year, the school had an enrollment of 216 students and 36.0 classroom teachers (on an FTE basis), for a student–teacher ratio of 6.8:1.

History
Leaders from the Associated Talmud Torahs (ATT) and Hebrew Theological College met in 1942 to address growing educational concerns. The primary problem centered around the fact that many Jewish children began to drop their studies around bar mitzvah time, setting the scene for rampant assimilation and a loss of tradition. They eventually established a plan: to create a high school which taught Judaic studies. Ideally, these students would move on to pursue Jewish higher education.

The school began as Chicago Jewish Academy and was first located on the West side on the corner of Douglas Blvd. and St. Louis Ave. It was a coeducational junior high school with grades 6-10, subsequent grades were added with each upcoming year. The school became a complete four-year secondary school in September, 1945. The first Commencement ceremony took place in June 1946.

By that time, the school outgrew its facilities. The ATT purchased the building of the Metropolitan Masonic Temple in the Garfield Park area; the school moved to the building in 1947. The three-story building was remodeled during the two-year waiting period to accommodate the needs of an academy.

Despite ample room and much progress, the West side of Chicago began to deteriorate as a whole by the early 1960s. The Academy was forced by virtue of circumstances to relocate in 1961 to the Torah Center.  The move helped catalyze the institution of a new branch, a yeshiva; a section of the high school for boys, which included intensified Talmudic studies. To satisfy the needs of parents and help hinder overcrowding, a third branch, a Girls' school, was established in September 1967.

The Chicago Jewish Academy made another move in 1968 due to overcrowding. To fund the move, the ATT proposed a campaign to raise funds for a building to house up to 400 students. This building, in the West Ridge area, a center of Jewish community regionally, was named the Ida Crown Jewish Academy, after a generous donation from the Crown family.

Later, the Academy would drop its junior high school, and both branches became their own separate Jewish high schools. The Yeshiva became Fasman Yeshiva High School, in Skokie, and the Girls' School became Hannah Sacks Bais Yaakov. Still, the atmosphere and philosophy has generally remained the same over more than fifty years of progress.

Ida Crown Jewish Academy made another move, this time to Skokie, to satisfy a student body that is primarily from the North Shore area and to address overcrowding at the current building. The building officially opened for learning on January 4, 2016.

Statistics
Days in year: 165
Hours in day: 9.67
Enrollment: 216
Tuition (2022-2023): $25,900/student

Recent athletic achievements
The wrestling team won the 2012 team IHSA Class 1A Regional at Walther Lutheran, the first regional title for ICJA, and the first regional wrestling title won by any Jewish high school in the US.
The baseball team came in 1st at the Columbus Baseball Invitational 2011, 2014, 2018, and 2022
Yeshiva University's Red Sarachek Tournament Champions 2008.
Boys' basketball team won the Joseph Weiner Memorial Basketball Tournament in 1990 and 1995 and 2008; Girls' team won in 1994 

Men's Teams:
 Basketball  
 Baseball 
 Cross Country  
 Fencing 
 Wrestling
 Soccer
Women's Teams:
 Basketball
 Cross Country
 Fencing
 Soccer

Curriculum
Levels: 0, not calculated into G.P.A.; 1.0, Modified/Regulars; 2.0, Honors—A is 5.0, B, 4.0, and so forth.
Scheduling: Arrival at 8:05am; prayer and breakfast until 9:05; followed by twelve thirty-nine-minute periods. Day ends at 5:39pm.

General Studies
Requirements:  Hebrew, 4 years

Judaic Studies
Required.
Single-gender classes for Judaic studies.
Boys' track: Four years of Tanakh and Talmudic Studies
Girls' track: Four years of Tanakh; one year of Mishnah; three years of either Talmud or Jewish philosophy/Oral Law; one half-year on family purity.

Notable alumni

 Yochi Dreazen, Deputy managing editor and foreign editor of Vox
 Nosson Tzvi Finkel, former Rosh Yeshiva of the Mir yeshiva in Jerusalem
 Moshe Gottesman, former Dean Emeritus of the Hebrew Academy of Nassau County, educator and community leader
 Gil Hoffman, chief political correspondent Jerusalem Post
 Jeff Seidel, director of the Jewish Student Information Center in Jerusalem and other Israeli cities
 Elie Seidman, CEO of Tinder
 Lee Shulman, former president of the Carnegie Foundation for the Excellence of Teaching
 Berel Wein, Rosh Yeshiva of Yeshiva Shaarei Torah of Rockland & Senior Faculty Yeshiva Ohr Somayach

See also

 History of the Jews in Chicago
Jewish education

References

External links

Modern Orthodox Jewish day schools in the United States
Educational institutions established in 1942
Jewish day schools in Illinois
Orthodox Judaism in Illinois
Private high schools in Illinois
1942 establishments in Illinois